The Calingasta River is a river of Argentina.

See also
List of rivers of Argentina

References
 Rand McNally, The New International Atlas, 1993.
  GEOnet Names Server 

Rivers of Argentina
Rivers of San Juan Province, Argentina